Oliver Wiswall House is a historic home located at Hudson in Columbia County, New York.  It was built about 1836 and is a -story, L-shaped brick dwelling with a low pitched hipped roof in the Greek Revival style.  The north elevation has porch with four Doric order columns and a dentilled cornice.  Also on the property is a garage dated to the 1930s.

It was added to the National Register of Historic Places in 1980.

References

Houses on the National Register of Historic Places in New York (state)
Greek Revival houses in New York (state)
Houses completed in 1836
Houses in Columbia County, New York
National Register of Historic Places in Columbia County, New York